Ivan Gazidis (born 13 September 1964) is a South African-Greek business executive and former footballer who last held an executive position at Italian Serie A club AC Milan.

Biography
Gazidis is of Greek origin, but was born in Johannesburg, South Africa. At the age of 4 moved to Manchester in the United Kingdom  and attended independent Manchester Grammar School. Being an adopted Mancunian from a young age, he supported Manchester City. Later he attended St Edmund Hall at the University of Oxford, where he was twice awarded a blue playing football against Cambridge in 1984 and 1985.  He graduated with a  degree in law in 1986 and in 1992 he moved to the United States to work for Latham & Watkins.

In 1994, he joined the founding management team of Major League Soccer, becoming in 2001 its deputy commissioner. He oversaw MLS's key strategic and business decisions and its marketing arm, Soccer United Marketing, of which he was president. He also helped promote the Mexican Football Federation and the CONCACAF Gold Cup.

In November 2008 Gazidis accepted the post of chief executive of Arsenal, a post he formally took up from 1 January 2009. He succeeded former managing director Keith Edelman and was expected to take over many of the roles formerly undertaken by ex-vice-chairman David Dein.

In 2017–18, he oversaw significant personnel changes at the top of the club in preparation for then manager Arsene Wenger's departure, which was announced in April 2018. Gazidis spearheaded the search for a new Manager, eventually hiring Unai Emery in May.

Upon announcing his departure, it was revealed his successors would be Vinai Venkatesham as Managing Director, and Raul Sanllehi as head of football.

On 18 September 2018, Gazidis announced that he would be leaving Arsenal to join A.C. Milan. He took up the role on 1 December 2018. During January 2020 transfer window, he opted to terminate Gonzalo Higuain's loan deal six months in advance. He approved the transfers of Krzysztof Piątek and Lucas Paquetá, both carried out by Leonardo. In his first season as the club's CEO, the team finished fifth in Serie A, which was its best result in six years. And just 2 seasons after, the team finished second in Serie A season 2020-2021; making them qualify to the UEFA Champions League for the first time since season 2012–2013. The next season A.C. Milan won the Serie A for the first time in 11 years.

References

20th-century English lawyers
South African people of Greek descent
White South African people
Alumni of St Edmund Hall, Oxford
Major League Soccer executives
Arsenal F.C. directors and chairmen
1964 births
Living people
Oxford University A.F.C. players
People associated with Latham & Watkins
A.C. Milan directors
South African soccer players
Association footballers not categorized by position
Lawyers from Manchester
South African emigrants to the United Kingdom